Ivan Georgievich Petrovsky (18 January 1901 – 15 January 1973) (the family name is also transliterated as Petrovskii or Petrowsky) was a Soviet mathematician working mainly in the field of partial differential equations. He greatly contributed to the solution of Hilbert's 19th and 16th problems, and discovered what are now called Petrovsky lacunas. He also worked on the theories of boundary value problems, probability, and on the topology of algebraic curves and surfaces.

Biography 

Petrovsky was a student of Dmitri Egorov. Among his students were Olga Ladyzhenskaya, Yevgeniy Landis, Olga Oleinik and Sergei Godunov.

Petrovsky taught at Steklov Institute of Mathematics. He was a member of the Soviet Academy of Sciences since 1946 and was awarded Hero of Socialist Labor in 1969. He was the president of Moscow State University (1951–1973) and the head of the International Congress of Mathematicians (Moscow, 1966). He is buried in the cemetery of the Novodevichy Convent in Moscow.

Selected publications
.
.
.

 

|
.
.

References 

. A very ample paper describing Petrovsky's scientific research, authored by friends, collaborators and pupils.
: an English translation of the paper .

. An interview with Vladimir Igorevich Arnol'd containing several important historical details about his teachers and other great mathematicians he knew when he was first studying and then working at the MSU Faculty of Mechanics and Mathematics, including Ivan Petrowsky.

.

External links

Short Biography of Petrowsky – from the Moscow Mathematical Journal

1901 births
1973 deaths
20th-century Russian mathematicians
Burials at Novodevichy Cemetery
Heroes of Socialist Labour
Full Members of the USSR Academy of Sciences
Academic staff of the Moscow Institute of Physics and Technology
Academic staff of Moscow State University
PDE theorists
Soviet mathematicians
Rectors of Moscow State University